Blue Horizon may refer to:

Music
Blue Horizon (Rory Block album) (1983)
Blue Horizon (Wishbone Ash album) (2014)
"Blue Horizon" (song), a 1999 song by Farmer's Daughter
Blue Horizon (record label), a British blues independent record label

Other uses
The Blue Horizon, a historic boxing venue in Philadelphia
Blue Horizon (novel), a novel by Wilbur Smith
Buddleja davidii 'Blue Horizon', a flowering plant cultivar